The Pomeroy Sport Centre, is a sports venue in the Canadian town of Fort St. John, British Columbia. The indoor arena features two ice hockey rinks, a long-track speed skating rink and a walking track. The venue was commissioned on 23 December 2009, and officially opened 13 October 2010.

History
Construction of the venue cost $44 million, of which $15 million was paid for by the provincial government. In addition to meeting local recreational needs, the venue was part of a provincial effort to provide for more elite sports efforts in the regional centres. In particular, the Peace River Region had been an important space for the development of several Canadian top speed skaters.

The first use of the speed skating rink took place on 23 December 2009. The venue was officially opened on 13 October 2010. The city subsequently signed a fifteen year naming deal with the Pomeroy Group.

Facilities
The ground floor features two North American-sized ice hockey rinks, with a combined spectator capacity of 1,000. The upper deck features a  walkway. All ice surfaces are artificial.

The Pomeroy Sport Centre is one of only three indoor long-track speed skating rinks in Canada, the others being the Olympic Oval in Calgary and Centre de Glaces in Quebec City and one of four in the Americas. It remains the sole such indoor venue in British Columbia after the Richmond Olympic Oval was converted to a general-purpose recreational centre after the conclusion of the 2010 Winter Olympics.

The venue is built on a  lot with 259 parking spaces on 96 Avenue. The landscaping was designed by Urban Systems.

References

Fort St. John, British Columbia
Sports venues in British Columbia
Speed skating venues in Canada
Indoor speed skating venues
Indoor ice hockey venues in Canada
2009 establishments in British Columbia
Sports venues completed in 2009